Hertha Töpper (19 April 1924 – 28 March 2020) was an Austrian contralto in opera and concert, and an academic voice teacher. A member of the Bavarian State Opera, she appeared in leading roles at major international opera houses and festivals.

Career 
Born in Graz as the daughter of a music teacher, Töpper began her singing studies at the Graz Conservatory while still at high school. In 1945, she made her operatic debut at the Graz Opera as Ulrica in Verdi's Un ballo in maschera. She remained an ensemble member until 1952. The first Bayreuth Festival after World War II invited her in 1951 for Wagner's Ring cycle.

Also in 1951, she first performed at the Bavarian State Opera in the title role of Der Rosenkavalier by Richard Strauss. She was a member of the Bavarian State Opera  from 1952 to 1981. In 1957 took part in the world premiere of Hindemith's opera Die Harmonie der Welt, and in 1972 in the premiere of Isang Yun's Sim Tjong. When the Cuvielles Theatre was reopened in 1958, she appeared as Cherubino in Mozart's Le nozze di Figaro, and for the reopening of the Nationaltheater in 1963, she was the Nurse in Die Frau ohne Schatten by Richard Strauss. Other significant roles included Dorabella in Mozart's Così fan tutte, Fricka in Das Rheingold, Brangäne in Tristan und Isolde, Magdalene in Die Meistersinger von Nürnberg, the title role in Bizet's Carmen, Lady Macbeth in Verdi's Macbeth, Eboli in Verdi's Don Carlo, Amneris in Aida, Hänsel in Humperdinck's Hänsel und Gretel, Judith in Bartok's Bluebeard's Castle and Iocaste in Stravinsky's Oedipus rex. She performed at great opera houses of the world, regularly at the Vienna State Opera, and also at La Scala in Milan, the Royal Opera House in London, La Monnaie in Brussels, in Amsterdam, Berlin, Rome, Venice and Zürich. She appeared at the Salzburg Festival in 1960, and at the Metropolitan Opera in New York City.

Besides opera, Töpper was renowned concert singer of lieder and oratorio; her collaboration with Karl Richter in the interpretation of works by Johann Sebastian Bach became reference works.

In 1949, Töpper married composer  (1902–1994). She was a professor of singing at the Musikhochschule München from 1971 until 1981, where Elisabeth von Magnus was among her students.

Töpper died in Munich on 28 March 2020, a few days before her 96th birthday.

Awards 
 1955 Bavarian Kammersängerin
 1962 Bavarian Order of Merit
 1985 Order of Merit of the Federal Republic of Germany, Officer's Cross (Verdienstkreuz 1. Klasse)
 1988 Great Cross of Honour of Styria
 1995 Bavarian Maximilian Order for Science and Art
 2009 Mastersingers Medal (Meistersinger-Medaille) of the Bavarian State Opera

References

Further reading 
 Walter Herrmann, : Legenden und Stars der Oper. Von Gigli über Callas bis Domingo und Netrebko. Leykam, Graz 2007, .

External links
 
 
 Töpper, Hertha bmlo.uni-muenchen.de
 Hertha Töpper (Contralto, Mezzo-soprano), Bach Cantatas Website
 , August Everding, 3sat. 1 October 1988
 Audiointerview mit Hertha Töpper im Onlinearchiv der Österreichischen Mediathek
 Hertha Töpper www.isoldes-liebestod.net
  with Joseph Keilberth
 
 "The contralto Hertha Töpper has died", Gramophone, 2 April 2020

Operatic contraltos
Academic staff of the University of Music and Performing Arts Munich
German music educators
Voice teachers
Officers Crosses of the Order of Merit of the Federal Republic of Germany
1924 births
Musicians from Graz
2020 deaths
20th-century Austrian women opera singers